This article lists the commanding generals of the Carabinieri, the national gendarmerie and a law enforcement agency of Italy.

List

See also 
 Commander-General of the Carabinieri
 List of chiefs of the Polizia di Stato

Notes

References 

1814 establishments in Italy
Carabinieri
Law enforcement in Italy
Italian police officers
Carabinieri
Italy law-related lists